Elm Park was a football stadium in the West Reading district of Reading, Berkshire, England. The stadium was the home of Reading Football Club from 1896 to 1998, when they moved to the new Madejski Stadium.

History 

In 1889, Reading were unable to continue playing at Coley Park as W.B. Monck (the local squire) no longer allowed football due to "rowdyism [by] the rougher elements". With club membership exceeding 300 by the time the club went professional in 1895, Reading required a proper ground. A meeting the following year determined that funding would be difficult. £20 was donated by J.C. Fidler, on the proviso that "no liquors were to be sold" on site. The rest of the cost was financed through donations by wealthy supporters, as well as one large individual donation. A former gravel pit in West Reading was identified as the site and the area was leased from Councillor Jesse.

The first game at Elm Park was held on 5 September 1896 between Reading and the A. Roston Bourke XI, named after honorary secretary of the Referees' Association Arthur Roston Bourke. The visitors were a scratch team from Holloway College and thus not registered with the Football Association. The match was abandoned due to torrential weather when Reading were leading 7–1. £44 was taken on the gate, with an attendance of approximately 2,500. After the match, Reading were fined £5 and suspended for playing against an unregistered team.

In 1908, the club's annual general meeting proposed moving to a new ground near Reading railway station. A board meeting the following year decided that the move would not be possible, as "there was no chance of a move to the ground near to the GWR railway stations due to the actions of the Great Western Railway".

As a result of Reading's relegation to Division Four after the 1982–83 season, they were threatened with a merger with Oxford United – a move which would have seen the closure of Elm Park. The teams' merger and closure of the stadium was subsequently averted and the following season saw Reading's promotion back to Division Three under the guidance of Ian Branfoot.

In January 1990, the Taylor Report made all-seater stadiums compulsory in the top two divisions of English football for the 1994–95 season. Reading were champions of Division Two in 1994 and were promoted to Division One. They became subject to the Taylor requirements, though converting Elm Park to an all-seater stadium would have been impractical. Instead, a location in Smallmead (to the south of the town) was identified as the site for a new stadium. The former council landfill site was bought for £1, with further conditions that the development of the stadium would include part-funding of the
A33 relief road. Expansion of the club's home would also allow alternative commercial ventures (particularly leisure facilities) and shared use with other teams (such as rugby union clubs Richmond and London Irish). The last competitive match at Elm Park took place on 3 May 1998 against Norwich City, with Reading losing 1-0, having already been relegated to Division Two, to a 57th-minute goal by a young Craig Bellamy.

Reading began the 1998–99 season at the Madejski Stadium, named after chairman John Madejski, who had taken over the club in 1991 and delivered the new stadium.

Structure and facilities 

Elm Park featured four stands:

North ("Norfolk Road")
South ("Tilehurst Terrace" or "South Bank")
West ("Tilehurst End")
East ("Reading End" or "Town End")

The north (with a capacity of 4,000 seated) and south (6,000 standing) stands were covered; the west and east stands were uncovered terraces. The east stand was reserved for away supporters, as was a small section of the north stand.

In 1920, the seats in the north stand were upholstered. At the same time, the railings on the south stand were moved forward  to allow a further 2,500 spectators in the ground.

The stadium's capacity was traditionally given as approximately 33,000, though changes implemented in the wake of the Taylor report meant that the capacity upon the ground's closure was approximately 14,800.

Records 
The ground's record attendance was in 1927, when 33,042 spectators watched Reading beat Brentford 1–0. The lowest attendance was on 26 October 1938 when 801 people watched Reading play Watford in the Division 3 cup.

Reading's greatest ticket revenue was on 27 January 1996, when the club hosted Manchester United in the fourth round of the 1995–96 FA Cup. Revenue from ticket sales totalled £110,741.

Highest attendance 
With the capacity previously far greater than the current capacity of the Madejski Stadium, Elm Park has been the venue of Reading's highest attendances to date. Reading's highest attendances at home have been:

Transport 
Bus services between Reading town centre and Elm Park were operated by Reading Buses. Reading West railway station was the closest railway station to the stadium, though major services only stop at Reading railway station.

References

Sources

External links 

Defunct football venues in England
Reading F.C.
Sports venues in Reading, Berkshire
Sports venues completed in 1896
Sports venues demolished in 1998
English Football League venues
Demolished sports venues in the United Kingdom